The 2022 Nigerian state legislative elections are called to fill vacant seats in state Houses of Assembly.

Background 
The 991 members of the 36 state Houses of Assembly are elected from single-seat constituencies using first-past-the-post voting; when vacancies occur, by-elections (or bye-elections) are called, scheduled, and administered by the Independent National Electoral Commission. New elections are also called if the general election was annulled by a court or election tribunal with these elections being referred to as supplementary elections if the election is only held in certain polling units and as rerun elections if the election held throughout the entire constituency.

By-elections

Cross River State

Akpabuyo State Constituency by-election 

On 26 October 2021, member for Akpabuyo Elizabeth Edem Ironbar (PDP) died from an undisclosed protracted illness. In December 2021, INEC stated its intent to use the Bimodal Voter Accreditation System (BVAS) technology for the by-election along with having polling unit workers upload results directly to the INEC results portal on Election Day. In January, INEC set the date for the by-election for 26 February alongside five other by-elections with party primaries taking place between 26 January and 5 February.

The APC nominated Bassey Effiom while Effiom Ekeng Edet was nominated by the PDP. In the days before the election, observers noted a contentious atmosphere as the two major parties traded accusations of planned manipulation and fears of violence rose. Both parties strove to win the election as it (along with the Ogoja/Yala Federal Constituency by-election) was one of the first elections in Cross River State since Governor Benedict Ayade defected to the APC in May 2021 and thus a powerful signal for the path the state is taking ahead of the 2023 elections.

On Election Day, voting was conducted peacefully; later, announced results showed the PDP's Effiom Ekeng Edet winning narrowly over the APC's Bassey Effiom by just over 500 votes. Almost immediately, the APC rejected the declared results and stated its intention to challenge the election.

Ekiti State

Ekiti East I State Constituency by-election 

On 31 January 2021, member for Ekiti East I Juwa Adegbuyi (APC) died from an undisclosed illness. INEC originally set the date for the by-election for 20 March 2021 with party primaries taking place between 26 February and 3 March. However, on the by-election date, multiple reports of violence and ballot snatching including the murder of 3 people at a polling station in Omuo where Senator Abiodun Olujimi was observing voting led INEC to suspend and postpone the by-election indefinitely. In December 2021, INEC stated its intent to use the Bimodal Voter Accreditation System (BVAS) technology for the by-election along with having polling unit workers upload results directly to the INEC results portal on Election Day. INEC Chairman Mahmud Yakubu also stated that the commission was planning on holding the by-election alongside the Ekiti State gubernatorial election, setting the new date for 18 June 2022.

On Election Day, Abraham Fatoba–the All Progressives Congress' nominee–won with just under 62% of the total vote. Coupled with an APC win in the gubernatorial election, the result was seen as a symbolic victory for the state party. Fatoba was sworn in 28 June, returning the Assembly to full membership for the first time since January 2021.

Imo State

Ngor Okpala State Constituency by-election 

On 26 October 2021, the seat of Ngor Okpala was declared vacant by Speaker Kennedy Ibeh after member Tochi Okere (PDP) did not attend the constitutionally-required amount of legislative meetings. In January, INEC set the date for the by-election for 26 February alongside five other by-elections with party primaries taking place between 26 January and 5 February. 

Analysts viewed the by-election as a key litmus test before the 2024 gubernatorial election as the PDP, which is seeking to retain the seat as its most major Imo figure and former Governor Emeka Ihedioha used to represent the area in the House of Representatives, and the APC, which is seeking to gain the seat and challenge PDP dominance in the area. It was also noted that APGA also was a major force in the area and wanted to reassert its relevance in Imo State ahead of the 2023 elections. In the days before the by-election, the three parties exchanged jabs while INEC affirmed its readiness to conduct the election.

However, on Election Day, a large number of INEC staff were kidnapped and the election was riddled by vote buying. Despite the incidents, the APC's Blyden Amajirionwu was declared winner as the PDP and civil groups called for the election's nullification.

Kaduna State

Giwa West State Constituency by-election 
On 15 December 2021, the member for Giwa West, Rilwanu Aminu Gadagau (APC), was killed in a bandit attack along the Kaduna-Zaria highway. Later in December 2021, INEC stated its intent to use the Bimodal Voter Accreditation System (BVAS) technology for the by-election along with having polling unit workers upload results directly to the INEC results portal on Election Day.

Plateau State

Pankshin South State Constituency by-election 

On 28 November 2021, member for Pankshin South, Henry Longs (APC), died from complications during a leg operation. In December 2021, INEC stated its intent to use the Bimodal Voter Accreditation System (BVAS) technology for the by-election along with having polling unit workers upload results directly to the INEC results portal on Election Day. In January, INEC set the date for the by-election for 26 February alongside five other by-elections with party primaries taking place between 26 January and 5 February.

In the days before the election, observers noted that both APC nominee Ezra Dakup and PDP nominee Peter Dasat appeared to have a clear chance at victory. When results were tabulated and announced, Dakup emerged the winner as he beat Dasat by just over 100 votes with a turnout of 24.39%. However, the PDP rejected the declared results and stated its intention to challenge the election.

Zamfara State

Gusau East State Constituency by-election 
On 29 January 2022, the member for Gusau East, Ibrahim Na’iddah, died from a "protracted illness."

Shinkafi State Constituency by-election 
On 29 June 2021, the member for Shinkafi, Muhammad Ahmad (APC), was killed in a bandit attack along the Sheme-Funtua highway in Katsina State. In December 2021, INEC stated its intent to use the Bimodal Voter Accreditation System (BVAS) technology for the by-election along with having polling unit workers upload results directly to the INEC results portal on Election Day.

References 

state legislative by-elections
2022 state